Bilgili, historically Eski Eruh, is a village in the Eruh District of Siirt Province in Turkey. The village is populated by Kurds of the Botikan tribe and had a population of 346 in 2021.

The hamlets of Çayır and Demirciler are attached to Bayramlı.

References 

Villages in Eruh District
Kurdish settlements in Siirt Province